The following is a list of episodes for the Australian television programme Murder Call (1997–2000), originally based on the novels of Jennifer Rowe.

The episodes were produced over two production seasons, however the network chose to split them into three televised seasons. When the series was cancelled, the final 9 episodes of the third season were held back and ultimately aired after a yearlong hiatus.

The entire series was released on DVD in 2019. It is currently available for streaming on 7plus, with episodes arranged in production order rather than broadcast order.

Series overview

Episodes

Series 1 (1997)

Series 2 (1998)

Series 3 (1999)

References

Murder Call